Alfredo Santaelena Aguado (born 13 October 1967), known simply as Alfredo as a player, is a Spanish retired footballer who played as a midfielder, currently the manager of CF Rayo Majadahonda .

He amassed La Liga totals of 211 games and seven goals over 11 seasons, representing in the competition Atlético Madrid, Deportivo and Sevilla. In 2003, he started working as a coach.

Playing career
Born in Madrid, Alfredo's career professional career began with hometown's Getafe CF in 1988, and he moved the following year to La Liga with neighbours Atlético Madrid; he was personally signed by chairman Jesús Gil after a friendly, going on to experience some of his best years whilst with the team.

On 29 June 1991, Alfredo scored the game's only goal against RCD Mallorca in the final of the Copa del Rey, also appearing in the following year, a 2–0 win over Real Madrid. He joined Deportivo de La Coruña in 1993 alongside teammate Donato, and produced roughly the same numbers, although he would be used more regularly.

Brought from the bench in the 1995 domestic cup final against Valencia CF, diminutive Alfredo scored with his head for the final 2–1 victory. He left for Sevilla FC two years later, being rarely used over a three-and-a-half-year spell and finishing his career at nearly 36, with his first and second clubs.

Coaching career
Santaelena took up coaching immediately after retiring, mainly in the lower leagues. In 2007, he led CD Cobeña – also in Madrid – to the third division for the first time ever, but the club folded soon after.

Starting in 2012, Santaelena spent several years in charge of Atlético's reserve teams. On 10 February 2014, following a Segunda División B loss at CD Sariñena which left the B side in the relegation zone, he was fired, being replaced by Óscar Mena who had also played for them in the 90s.

In November 2016, Santaelena took over UD San Sebastián de los Reyes also in the third tier. He was dismissed on 21 January 2018, and spent more than a year without a club before being named in charge of Internacional de Madrid of the same league on 2 July 2020.

Managerial statistics

Honours
Atlético Madrid
Copa del Rey: 1990–91, 1991–92

Deportivo
Copa del Rey: 1994–95
Supercopa de España: 1995

References

External links

Deportivo archives

1967 births
Living people
Spanish footballers
Footballers from Madrid
Association football midfielders
La Liga players
Segunda División players
Segunda División B players
Getafe CF footballers
Atlético Madrid footballers
Deportivo de La Coruña players
Sevilla FC players
Spain under-21 international footballers
Spanish football managers
Segunda División B managers
Tercera División managers
Primera Federación managers
Marbella FC managers
Atlético Madrid B managers